USS Bisbee (PF-46) was a United States Navy  in commission from 1944 to 1945 and from 1950 to 1951. She also served in the Soviet Navy as EK-17 and in the Colombian National Armada as ARC Capitán Tono.

Construction and commissioning
Originally classified as a patrol gunboat, PG-154, Bisbee was reclassified as a patrol frigate, PF-46, on 15 April 1943. She was launched on 7 September 1943, at the Consolidated Steel Corporation shipyard in Los Angeles, California, sponsored by Mrs. Richard Murphy, and commissioned on 15 February 1944.

Service history

U.S. Navy, World War II, 1944–1945
Assigned to the United States Pacific Fleet and manned by the United States Coast Guard, Bisbee joined the United States Seventh Fleet at Nouméa, New Caledonia, on 27 June 1944.  She took part in the landings on Biak Island of 12–31 August 1944, and then patrolled off the New Guinea coast until October 1944.  During the invasion of Leyte in the Philippine Islands, she served as a patrol and harbor control vessel until detached for escort duty on 22 November 1944.  Bisbee arrived at Pearl Harbor, Territory of Hawaii, on 15 December 1944.

After undergoing repairs, Bisbee departed Pearl Harbor on 6 January 1945 for Dutch Harbor, Territory of Alaska, arriving there on 13 January 1945.  From then until July 1945, she escorted merchant ships and United States Army transports between Dutch Harbor, Adak, Amchitka, and Attu, and acted as guard ship for Fleet Air Wing 4 in the North Pacific Ocean.

Stage and film actor Buddy Ebsen served as the Executive Officer aboard Bisbee during this deployment to the Pacific War Zone.

Selected for transfer to the Soviet Navy in Project Hula – a secret program for the transfer of U.S. Navy ships to the Soviet Navy at Cold Bay, Alaska, in anticipation of the Soviet Union joining the war against Japan – Bisbee, with Escort Division 43, departed Adak on 6 July 1945 bound for Seattle, Washington, arriving there on 12 July 1945.  After undergoing repairs and conversion in preparation for her transfer, Bisbee steamed to Cold Bay, where she arrived on 13 August 1945. She soon began training her new Soviet crew.

Soviet Navy, 1945–1949

Commissioned into the Soviet Navy immediately, Bisbee was designated as a storozhevoi korabl ("escort ship") and renamed EK-17 in Soviet service. She soon departed Cold Bay bound for Petropavlovsk-Kamchatsky in the Soviet Union, where she served as a patrol vessel in the Soviet Far East.

In February 1946, the United States began negotiations for the return of ships loaned to the Soviet Union for use during World War II. On 8 May 1947, United States Secretary of the Navy James V. Forrestal informed the United States Department of State that the United States Department of the Navy wanted 480 of the 585 combatant ships it had transferred to the Soviet Union for World War II use returned, EK-17 among them. Negotiations for the return of the ships were protracted, but on 1 November 1949 the Soviet Union finally returned EK-17 to the U.S. Navy at Yokosuka, Japan.

U.S. Navy, Korean War, 1950–1951
Reverting to her original name, Bisbee lay idle in the Pacific Reserve Fleet at Yokosuka until being recommissioned on 18 October 1950 for service in the Korean War. She got underway for Korea on 23 November 1950, and served on patrol, escort, and bombardment duty off Korea – also making occasional voyages to the Philippine Islands, Hong Kong, and the Pescadores – until decommissioned on 20 October 1951.

Colombian Navy, 1952–1963
After repairs at Yokosuka, the ship was transferred to Colombia on 13 February 1952 under the Mutual Defense Assistance Program, serving in the Colombian Navy as ARC Capitán Tono. She relieved her sister ship ARC Almirante Padilla, ex-, and served on patrol off the east coast of Korea. Exchanges of fire with shore batteries were a frequent occurrence, and her crew suffered some casualties. On 13 January 1953, Capitán Tono ended her tour of duty and was replaced by another of her sister ships, ARC Almirante Brión, ex-USS Burlington (PF-51).

The ship remained in Colombian service after the Korean War and was scrapped in 1963.

Awards
The U.S. Navy awarded Bisbee two battle stars for her World War II service and three for her Korean War service.

References

External links
 
USS Bisbee (PF-46), United States Coast Guard site

Tacoma-class frigates
Ships built in Los Angeles
1943 ships
World War II frigates and destroyer escorts of the United States
Tacoma-class frigates of the Soviet Navy
World War II frigates of the Soviet Union
Cold War frigates of the Soviet Union
Cold War frigates and destroyer escorts of the United States
Korean War frigates and destroyer escorts of the United States
Tacoma-class frigates of the Colombian Navy
Korean War frigates of Colombia
Ships transferred under Project Hula